It's You is an album by American jazz saxophonist Lee Konitz, recorded in Denmark in 1996 and released on the Danish SteepleChase label.

Critical reception

Scott Yanow of AllMusic wrote: "The focus is mostly on Konitz, and he is in top form, playing inventively and thoughtfully ... This is a melodic and cool-toned bop session that finds Lee Konitz often sounding as if he is thinking aloud".

Track listing 
All compositions by Lee Konitz except where noted
 "Thingin'" – 9:47
 "Angel Eyes" (Matt Dennis, Earl Brent) – 8:14
 "Boo Doo" – 6:35
 "It's You" – 9:55
 "Mella" – 8:48
 "April in Nimes" (Ron McClure) – 8:11

Personnel 
Lee Konitz – alto saxophone
Ron McClure – bass
Billy Hart – drums

References 

Lee Konitz albums
1996 albums
SteepleChase Records albums